The 2015 Big Ten Conference men's soccer tournament was the 25th edition of the tournament. It determined the Big Ten Conference's automatic berth into the 2015 NCAA Division I Men's Soccer Championship.

The Maryland Terrapins won the tournament, besting the Ohio State Buckeyes in the championship match.

Bracket

Schedule

Preliminary round

Quarterfinals

Semifinals

Final

Statistical leaders

All-Tournament team 
The following players were selected as the best players of the tournament.

 Grant Lillard, Indiana
 Tsubasa Endoh, Maryland
 Cody Niedermeier, Maryland
 Eryk Williamson, Maryland
 Rylee Woods, Michigan
 Layth Masri, Northwestern
 Yaw Amankwa, Ohio State
 Zach Mason, Ohio State
 Evan Finney, Penn State
 Mitch Taintor, Rutgers
 Andrew Conner, Wisconsin

See also 
 Big Ten Conference Men's Soccer Tournament
 2015 Big Ten Conference men's soccer season
 2015 NCAA Division I men's soccer season
 2015 NCAA Division I Men's Soccer Championship

References

External links 
Tournament Schedule

Big Ten Men's Soccer Tournament
Big Ten Men's Soccer Tournament
Big Ten Men's Soccer Tournament